Shaun Williams (born 19 October 1986) is an Irish professional footballer who plays as a defensive midfielder for English League Two club Gillingham. He has previously played for Drogheda United, Finn Harps, Sporting Fingal, MK Dons, Millwall and Portsmouth.

Career

Drogheda United
Raised in Portmarnock in North Dublin, Williams signed for nearby League of Ireland club Drogheda United at the start of the 2005 season and played with the club's under 21 side for the year. After impressing for the under 21 side, Williams was offered a full-time professional contract with the club which he signed ahead of the 2006 season. Struggling to make his first team breakthrough that year, Drogheda looked to loan him out for the following year for experience.

Dundalk loan
Williams spent the 2007 League of Ireland First Division season on loan at Drogheda United's County Louth rivals Dundalk. He made 25 appearances, scoring 8 goals as Dundalk finished in 3rd place.

Finn Harps loan
He spent the opening half of the 2008 season on loan from Drogheda United at Finn Harps following their promotion to the League of Ireland Premier Division in 2007 via the playoffs. He made 14 appearances, scoring two goals. His first goal came in the opening match of the season as Harps beat fellow Premier Division newcomers Cobh Ramblers 2–1 in Finn Park. He followed that up with his second in three games as Harps beat U.C.D. 1–0.
Failing to score in the rest of his appearances for Harps, his loan ended in Summer 2008 as he returned to Drogheda United for the remainder of the season.

Return from loans
He made his first team debut for the club on 20 July 2008, coming off the bench at halftime for Sami Ristilä in a 1–0 win over Cork City. He went on to make a further 3 appearances before the end of the season.

Sporting Fingal
Williams signed for League of Ireland First Division side Sporting Fingal and made his debut away to Waterford United on 7 March 2009. He scored 10 goals in 25 appearances in all competitions as his side finished 3rd in the league, beating Bray Wanderers 4–2 on aggregate in the Promotion/relegation play-off Final. They also beat Sligo Rovers to win the 2009 FAI Cup with Williams playing the full 90 minutes of the Final at Tallaght Stadium. He was voted into the PFAI First Division Team of the Year at the end of the season. The 2010 season was Fingal's first ever season in the League of Ireland Premier Division but they and Williams took to it well, finishing in 4th place and earning a UEFA Europa League place for the following season. Williams made his first appearances in European competition in July 2010 when he captain his side at home and away to C.S. Marítimo of Portugal as they lost both legs 3–2. Williams was selected in the League of Ireland XI to play a friendly against Manchester United in the first ever match at the Aviva Stadium. At the end of the season, Williams won the 2010 PFAI Young Player of the Year award as voted by his fellow players at the end of the season. Just weeks before the 2011 season, Sporting Fingal went out of existence due to financial difficulties leaving Williams a free agent.

Milton Keynes Dons
On 16 March 2011, Williams signed for MK Dons. Despite making his name as a midfielder, he primarily as a centre-half for the club due to injuries and a small squad. At the end of the 2012–13 campaign, Williams was crowned the MK Dons Player of the Year and the Players' Player of the Year.

Millwall

On 27 January 2014, Williams signed for Millwall on a -year contract for an undisclosed fee. During his time at Millwall he accumulated 290 appearances in all competitions, scoring 22 goals.

Portsmouth
On 25 June 2021, Williams signed for Portsmouth of League One. Williams was released after one season at the club.

Gillingham
On 10 June 2022, Williams signed for League Two side Gillingham, reuniting with his former Millwall manager Neil Harris. He made his debut for the Kent side on the opening day of the 2022–23 season in a 2–0 away defeat to AFC Wimbledon. He scored his first goal for Gillingham on 5 February 2023, the only goal in a 1–0 home victory over Crawley Town.

International career
He made his senior Republic of Ireland debut at the age of 31 in a 2-0 friendly loss against France in May 2018. Williams scored his first senior international goal for Ireland on 6 September 2018, after coming off the bench against Wales in the UEFA Nations League.

International goals
Scores and results list Ireland's goal tally first.

Career statistics
Professional appearances – correct as of match played on 11 March 2023.

Honours
Millwall
EFL League One play-offs: 2017

Individual
PFAI Team of the Year: First Division (2009), Premier Division (2010)
PFAI Young Player of the Year: 2010
Milton Keynes Dons Player of the Year: 2012–13
Milton Keynes Dons Players' Player of the Year: 2012–13

References

External links

 

1986 births
Living people
Sportspeople from Fingal
Republic of Ireland association footballers
Republic of Ireland under-21 international footballers
Republic of Ireland under-23 international footballers
Republic of Ireland international footballers
Association football defenders
Association football midfielders
Drogheda United F.C. players
Dundalk F.C. players
Finn Harps F.C. players
Sporting Fingal F.C. players
Milton Keynes Dons F.C. players
Millwall F.C. players
Portsmouth F.C. players
Gillingham F.C. players
League of Ireland players
English Football League players
League of Ireland XI players
Republic of Ireland expatriate association footballers